The Fairfield Stags men's soccer team represents Fairfield University in Fairfield, Connecticut and competes in the Metro Atlantic Athletic Conference (MAAC) of NCAA Division I. The Stags play their home games at Lessing Field on the campus of Fairfield University. The team was ranked nationally in 1998 (24th), 2000 (15th), 2001 (12th), 2005 (24th), 2006 (15th) 2007 (17th) and 2011 (25th) and competed in the NCAA Division I Men's Soccer Tournament in 1999, 2006, 2008, and 2011. The 2006 team advanced to the second round in the NCAA Tournament after defeating in-state rival University of Connecticut, 2–1. The team also won the MAAC Championship Tournament in 1999, 2006, 2008, 2011, and 2017. Individually, ten players have earned Regional All-American honors including Mark Longwell '82 who was the first Stag to go on to play for the United States men's national soccer team and major professional soccer for the NASL Tampa Bay Rowdies. The Stags are currently coached by 1998 New England Coach of the Year Carl Rees.

History

Dawn of the Stags

The Fairfield Stags men's soccer program first began in 1964.  Fairfield University Athletic Hall of Famer James Kuhlmann was the founding coach who dedicated himself to the university and the development of the program over the next 24 years.  Coach Kuhlmann's dedication and efforts culminated in the Stags becoming a routine MAAC contender in the 1980s with standout players Mark Longwell '82, who went on to play for the United States men's national soccer team and the NASL Tampa Bay Rowdies, and Alberto Zappala '82 leading the way.

Red Stags Rising
With Head Coach Carl Rees manning the helm over the past decade the Stags have been ranked among the nation's elite programs having produced seven NSCAA Regional All-Americans and achieved seven winning seasons, including double-digit win totals in five of the last 10 campaigns. In 1998, the Stags posted a program-high 15 wins, and earned a No. 24 national ranking, the first-ever top 25 poll appearance by any Fairfield University team.  In 1999, the Stags won its first MAAC tournament title and the program's first NCAA play-in berth. In 2000, the Stags earned a No. 15 national ranking. In 2001, the Stags placed in the national rankings all but two weeks, hitting a program-high of number 12. In 2005, the Stags posted an unbeaten conference record (8-0-1) for the first time in school history and captured the MAAC regular-season championship. The Stags also garnered a national ranking in the 2005 polls, thanks in part to an unbeaten mark during the month of October (8-0-1).

2006 season
In 2006 the Stags became the first Fairfield team in any sport to advance past the first round of an NCAA Tournament, as they defeated UConn 2–1 in the NCAA Men's Soccer Championship in Storrs, CT.  After winning the MAAC regular season and post season championship, the Stags, led by seniors Alex Cunliffe and Mike Troy, as well as juniors Tom Skara, J.P. Francini and Sam Bailey, entered the UConn game as the underdog.  A goal by senior Jimmy Gaughan broke a 1–1 tie and solid goaltending from Francini kept the lead for Fairfield who upset the Huskies. The Stags lost to Towson in the second round, but will be remembered as one of the best athletic teams in school history.

All-time head coaches

Awards

All-Time statistic leaders

Stags in the pros

References

External links

 
Soccer clubs in Connecticut
1964 establishments in Connecticut